Hungarian Rhapsody No. 5, S.244/5, in E minor, is the fifth in a set of 19 Hungarian Rhapsodies by composer Franz Liszt. It is marked Lento, con duolo. The piece was given the nickname Héroïde-élégiaque by the composer himself. It is very different from his other Hungarian Rhapsodies, as it does not follow the intro - lassan - friska structure and can be viewed as the darkest and most melancholic of the set. It was later arranged for orchestra.

Sources of the melodies 
The tunes in this rhapsody originate from a Hungarian dance by József Kossovits, entitled Hősi elégia.

External links
 

05
1847 compositions

Compositions in E minor